This list of shipwrecks in 1994 includes ships sunk, foundered, grounded, or otherwise lost during 1994.

January

2 January

13 January

15 January

25 January

28 January

February

1 February

3 February

6 February

9 February

13 February

15 February

22 February

23 February

24 February

25 February

28 February

March

4 March

5 March

13 March

23 March

April

23 April

29 April

May

11 May

16 May

June

5 June

8 June

10 June

11 June

21 June

22 June

26 June

July

6 July

13 July

23 July

24 July

August

1 August

2 August

3 August

4 August

8 August

11 August

21 August

Unknown date

September

3 September

9 September

14 September

16 September

18 September

19 September

20 September

23 September

28 September

29 September

30 September

October

8 October

12 October

25 October

26 October

November

11 November

12 November

18 November

30 November

December

2 December

9 December

21 December

24 December

Unknown date

References

1994
 
Ship